Auxiliary Point is a cape in the Lake Mead reservoir in Clark County, Nevada.  Auxiliary Point marks the mouth of Boulder Canyon, a canyon on the Colorado River, above Hoover Dam, now flooded by Lake Mead.

References

Auxiliary Point
Landforms of Clark County, Nevada